Meinl is a surname. Notable people with the surname include:

Julius Meinl I (1824–1914), Austrian businessman
Julius Meinl V (born 1959), British businessman, great-great-grandson of Julius Meinl I
Roland Meinl, founder of Meinl Percussion
Beate Meinl-Reisinger (born 1978), Austrian politician

Surnames of Austrian origin